Massimo Bruschini (30 August 1942 – 28 December 1975) was an Italian boxer. He competed in the men's light middleweight event at the 1964 Summer Olympics.

References

1942 births
1975 deaths
Italian male boxers
Olympic boxers of Italy
Boxers at the 1964 Summer Olympics
Boxers from Rome
Light-middleweight boxers
20th-century Italian people